Picture Perfect is the fifth studio album by the American hard rock band 12 Stones, The album was released on July 14, 2017 through independent label Cleopatra Records.

Overview 
The title track, "Picture Perfect", was chosen as the first single for the album. The music video was premiered on Loudwire on June 14, 2017.

Critical reception 

The album received positive reviews. Michael Weaver of Jesus Freak Hideout stated that "while the band doesn't change up their formula any, they do however, execute it to perfection" and that "there are some spiritual overtones interspersed, but Paul McCoy focuses much more on maintaining an overall positive message in his lyrics." Daniel Höhr of KNAC.com reviewed the album and he stated "There are definitely fillers amongst the fourteen tracks on Picture Perfect, so less would certainly be more in this case."

Track listing

Personnel 
Adapted from AllMusic.

12 Stones
 Paul McCoy – lead vocals
 Eric Weaver – guitar, bass guitar
 Sean Dunaway – drums, percussion

Additional personnel
 Fendi Nugroho	– design, layout
 Dave Fortman – producer, mixing
 David Troia – co-producer, engineering

References 

2017 albums
12 Stones albums
Cleopatra Records albums